The 1889–90 season was the first in existence for Sheffield United.  Having not been elected to any organised league at that point they predominantly played friendly fixtures but did enter the FA Cup for the first time as well as locally arranged cup competitions The Sheffield Challenge Cup and the Wharncliffe Charity Cup.  The club did not employ a manager in this period; tactics and team selection were decided by The Football Committee and the players were coached by a trainer. J.B. Wostinholm held the position of club secretary, dealing with player transfers and contracts, arranging matches and dealing with the FA.  The first season was deemed a reasonable success with steady attendances to home games and progress in the FA Cup although the fluctuating nature of the team meant that consistency was never really achieved.

As the season progressed it became obvious that a better standard of player would be required to succeed in League Football and the club began to recruit new players in the spring, notably signing Rab Howell, Mick Whitham and Arthur Watson from nearby Rotherham Swifts who were in financial difficulties.  United eventually reached the second round proper of the FA Cup where they were comprehensively beaten by the more experienced Bolton Wanderers and finished the season having been accepted to play in the newly formed Midland Counties League the following term.

Background
Sheffield United had been formed earlier in 1889 by the organising committee of the Sheffield United Cricket Club in response to the growing popularity of the game.  They viewed a football team as a means of generating extra revenue and a greater utilisation of the club facilities, particularly in the winter months. The initial plan was to sign a core squad of players and augment them with the best amateur players from the region as guests.  The club had duly advertised for players in the local press and in Glasgow as it was considered that Scotland was an untapped pool of talent.  Respondents were invited for trials and a basic squad were offered contracts.

Kit
For their first season the team wore a plain white 'jersey' and blue 'knickers' and socks.  The club would not adopt its now traditional red and white stripes until the following season.

Season overview

With a team assembled over the summer months, United played their first ever fixture against Notts Rangers on 7 September 1889, a game which they lost 4–1. As they were not part of any organised league the club arranged a series of friendly and exhibition games to fill the schedule of their fledgling club.  Their opponents were drawn both from the local area (Sheffield having a number of established teams at this time) and from further afield, particularly the North-West and West Midlands.

The establishment of a new, well-financed, football team in the city had caused some consternation amongst the local FA and United undertook a low-key start, not playing their first game at Bramall Lane until the end of September, against Birmingham St. George's. The team continued to play regularly and attendances at Bramall Lane steadily increased as interest in the new side grew. The team performed well against local sides but the fluctuating nature of the squad during this period meant there was little consistency in results. By December however, it had become clear that better quality of players would be required if the club was to develop and take on the more established sides playing in the Football League. The initial plan of maintaining a core of players that would be boosted from the ranks of the local amateur game had not borne fruit as the players who appeared were often ageing and past their best. Similarly the players recruited from Scotland had largely failed to impress and so the football committee looked to bring in fresh players to strengthen the team.

Ironically, their first two new signings were a Scot, William Calder, and another local amateur, T.B.A. Clarke, who both arrived in December 1889 but the team was beginning to take on a more professional image. The team continued their campaign of friendly fixtures into 1890, with varying degrees of success, whilst competing in the FA Cup for the first time. With the club hoping to be accepted into the newly formed Midland Counties League for the following season the committee made a number of additions to the squad in March, signing Billy Bairstow from local side Sheffield Club but more significantly signing a trio of players from nearby Rotherham Swifts. Rab Howell, Arthur Watson and Michael Whitham would all become stalwarts of the team in the coming seasons, with both Howell and Whitham subsequently going on to represent England. They represented United's first reported entry into the transfer market, arriving for a combined fee of £200, and signalled a new era of full professionalism for the club.

FA Cup
United made their debut in the FA Cup in an away fixture against Scarborough on 7 October 1889, a game which they comprehensively won 6–1. Required to play a number of qualifying games they went on to play various local sides before reaching the First round proper when they took on Burnley in January 1990. Having dispatched the Clarets, United were drawn against another Lancashire side in the next round – Bolton Wanderers.  Giving up home advantage in return for a payment of £40 (a practice that was actually against the rules of the competition) they travelled across the Pennines only to be trounced 13–0, a result that remains United's worst ever cup defeat.

Local cup competitions
United entered both the Sheffield Challenge Cup and the Wharncliffe Charity Cup during the course of the season. Both competitions were ratified by the Sheffield FA and as such were viewed as fully competitive fixtures within the local area.  United progressed through three early rounds of the Challenge Cup, beating Sheffield Exchange, Heeley and Attercliffe before facing Staveley at Bramall Lane in the semi-final. A 2–0 victory was enough to see them progress to the team's first ever 'cup final' where they took on an experienced Rotherham Town side over two legs.  United were held to a 0–0 draw in the first fixture at Bramall Lane but succumbed to a single goal in the return leg which was played at the ground of Rotherham Swifts.

The Wharncliffe Cup was a smaller affair and The Blades needed only to beat Doncaster Rovers in a home game to progress to the semi-final.  They travelled to Staveley but were beaten 2–1 by their hosts.

Squad
Source:

First team

Players leaving before end of the season

Other players
During this season a number of other players played first team games for United during their various fixtures.  They were either triallists who were not retained or local players drawn from neighbouring clubs as 'guests'.  The only guest player to feature in a competitive fixture was 'T. Wilson'  who played in the FA Cup first round match against Burnley.  'Wilson' was most likely a pseudonym and his true identity remains unknown.

Transfers

In

Out

Appearances and goals

|}

Results
Source:

Key

FA Cup

Sheffield Challenge Cup

Wharncliffe Charity Cup

Friendlies

Notes
Source:

Bibliography

References

External links
 Sheffield United F.C.'s official website

Sheffield United F.C. seasons
Sheffield United